The Hezarjarib District is a district (bakhsh) in Neka County, Mazandaran Province, Iran. At the 2006 census, its population was 14,165, in 3,440 families.  The District has no cities.  The District has two rural districts (dehestan): Estakhr-e Posht Rural District and Zarem Rud Rural District.

References 

Neka County
Districts of Mazandaran Province